The 1953 World Table Tennis Championships men's doubles was the 20th edition of the men's doubles championship.
Ferenc Sidó and József Kóczián won the title after defeating Richard Bergmann and Johnny Leach in the final by three sets to two.

Results

See also
List of World Table Tennis Championships medalists

References

-